Ni Orsi Jr. (born September 14, 1944) is an American alpine skier. He competed in the men's downhill at the 1964 Winter Olympics.

References

1944 births
Living people
American male alpine skiers
Olympic alpine skiers of the United States
Alpine skiers at the 1964 Winter Olympics
Sportspeople from Stockton, California